Karezat , is a district in the Balochistan province of Pakistan. In 2022, it was separated from Pashin District. Karezat's headquarters are at Khanozai Bazar. The name Karezat is a modernized form of ‘Karezes’. The largest city is Khanozai Bazar.

Administrations 
 Karezat Tehsil
 Barshore Tehsil

References 

Districts of Balochistan, Pakistan